The 2018 season was Perak The Bos Gaurus Football Club's 15th consecutive season in Malaysia Super League. The team participated in Malaysia Super League, the Malaysia FA Cup, and the Malaysia Cup.

Squad information

First-team squad

Coaching staff

Management team

Club personnel
Under new management, the Presidency was taken over by the Secretary General State of Perak, Yang Berhormat Dato' Seri Abdul Puhat Mat Nayan on 4 October 2015.

Pre-season and friendlies

Competitions

Overview

{| class="wikitable" style="text-align: center"
|-
!style="background:Yellow; color:Black;" rowspan=2|Competition
!style="background:Yellow; color:Black;" colspan=8|Record
!style="background:Yellow; color:Black;" rowspan=2|Started round
!style="background:Yellow; color:Black;" rowspan=2|Current position / round
!style="background:Yellow; color:Black;" rowspan=2|Final position / round
!style="background:Yellow; color:Black;" rowspan=2|First match	
!style="background:Yellow; color:Black;" rowspan=2|Last match
|-
!style="background:Yellow; color:Black;"|
!style="background:Yellow; color:Black;"|
!style="background:Yellow; color:Black;"|
!style="background:Yellow; color:Black;"|
!style="background:Yellow; color:Black;"|
!style="background:Yellow; color:Black;"|
!style="background:Yellow; color:Black;"|
!style="background:Yellow; color:Black;"|
|-
| Super League

| –
| 2nd
| 2nd
| 3 February 2018
| 28 July 2018
|-
| FA Cup

| Second Round
| Quarter-finals
| Quarter-finals
| 3 March 2018
| 21 April 2018
|-
| Malaysia Cup

| Group Stage
| Champions
| Champions
| 4 August 2018
| 27 October 2018
|-
! Total

Malaysia Super League

League table

Results by matchday

Matches

Malaysia FA Cup

Malaysia Cup

Group stage

Knock-stage

Statistics

Appearances and goals

Clean sheets

Transfers

In
1st leg

2nd leg

Out
1st leg

2nd leg

References

Perak F.C. seasons
Malaysian football clubs 2018 season